Angiolo Profeti (23 May 1918 – 28 April 1981), was an Italian shot putter and discus thrower.

Biography
Profeti has 26 caps in Italy national athletics team. In his career, he participated in an edition of the Olympic Games and won 15 national championships in discus throw, and its record for speciality ex aequo with Adolfo Consolini.

Achievements

National titles
15 wins in shot put at the Italian Athletics Championships (1938, 1939, 1940, 1941, 1942, 1945, 1946, 1947, 1948, 1949, 1950, 1951, 1952, 1953, 1954)
1 win in discus throw at the Italian Athletics Championships (1950)

References

External links
 

1918 births
1981 deaths
People from Castelfiorentino
Sportspeople from the Metropolitan City of Florence
Italian male discus throwers
Olympic athletes of Italy
Athletes (track and field) at the 1952 Summer Olympics
European Athletics Championships medalists
Italian male shot putters
Mediterranean Games gold medalists for Italy
Mediterranean Games silver medalists for Italy
Athletes (track and field) at the 1951 Mediterranean Games
Mediterranean Games medalists in athletics
Italian Athletics Championships winners
20th-century Italian people